The 1970–71 Illinois Fighting Illini men's basketball team represented the University of Illinois.

Regular season

Head coach Harv Schmidt, in only his fourth season at the helm of the Fighting Illini men's basketball team, saw the longest losing streak of his career, 8 games. After starting the year by winning 9 of their first 12 games and 10 of their first 14, the Illini started their losing streak at Ohio State on February 13, and continue for a month.  The agonizing month ended March 13, 1971, when the Illini visited Indiana in the season finale.  The Fighting Illini finished the season with an 11-12 record, tied for 5th place in the conference with a 5-9 record.

The Illini added sophomore forward Nick Weatherspoon for the season.  Weatherspoon finished his inaugural season by scoring 381 points, averaging 16.5 points per game, and collected 246 rebounds. By the completion of his time at Illinois, Weatherspoon was their all-time leading scorer.

The 1970-71 team's starting lineup included Weatherspoon and Fred Miller at the forward spots, Jim Krelle and Rick Howat as guards and Greg Jackson at center.

Roster

Source

Schedule
																																																
Source																																																																																																
																																																
|-																																																
!colspan=12 style="background:#DF4E38; color:white;"| Non-Conference regular season

	

|-
!colspan=9 style="background:#DF4E38; color:#FFFFFF;"|Big Ten regular season

|-

Player stats

Awards and honors
Rick Howat
Team Most Valuable Player

Team players drafted into the NBA

Rankings

References

Illinois Fighting Illini
Illinois Fighting Illini men's basketball seasons
1970 in sports in Illinois
1971 in sports in Illinois